Hoani is a town located on the island of Mohéli in the Comoros.

Hoani is an internationally significant nesting site for the Green turtle.

Populated places in Mohéli